Norman Hobson (born 22 August 1933) is a former professional footballer who played as a right back for Shrewsbury Town. Norman signed from Oswestry Town in October 1954 and spent 8 seasons at Shrewsbury, making 212 league appearances scoring 5 goals along with 10 FA Cup appearances, 2 league cup appearances with 1 goal. He moved to the Telford-based Sankey's Football Club in January 1962. In 1958/59 season he won promotion with Shrewsbury Town to 3rd tier of English football and played under legendary Town player manager Arthur Rowley. His last appearance for Shrewsbury was on 7 January 1962 in a 1–1 away draw at Aldershot in the 3rd round of the FA Cup. He also played a part in the Shrewsbury team that got to the League Cup semi final that same year. Hobson captained Colwyun Bay to the Welsh League (North) title in 1965.

Honours
with Shrewsbury Town
 Football League Fourth Division promotion 1958–59

References
General
 

Specific

1933 births
Living people
English footballers
Oswestry Town F.C. players
Colwyn Bay F.C. players
Shrewsbury Town F.C. players
Sportspeople from Shrewsbury
Association football fullbacks
English Football League players
Oswestry Town F.C. managers
English football managers